The 1903 Lake Forest football team was an American football team that represented Lake Forest College in the 1903 college football season.  In Clarence Herschberger's 2nd season as head coach, the Foresters compiled a 6–1 record, and outscored their opponents 103 to 67.  Lake Forest's only loss was against a Notre Dame team that had successfully executed an undefeated and unscored upon season, compiling an 8–0–1 record and outscored their opponents 291 to 0.

Schedule

References

Lake Forest
Lake Forest Foresters football seasons
Lake Forest Foresters football